The Equal Value of Life Years Gained or evLYG is a generic measure used to determine how much a medical treatment can extend the life of the patient. Unlike other healthcare metrics, the evLYG does not consider the quality of life for the patient; it exclusively considers the length of life. It is used in economic evaluation to determine the added time a treatment may give a patient. Critics argue the evLYG measurement is flawed because it values a medication based solely on the added years of life. A higher priced drug that both extends life and adds two years of life receives the same evLYG score as a lower priced drug that adds two years but does not improve life.

The evLYG is used in concert with the Quality-Adjusted Life Year (QALY) to reduce the discriminatory characteristics of the QALY, which has been criticized as being ageist or ableist for placing more value on the lives of younger people without disability. The Institute for Clinical and Economic Review (ICER) uses a hybrid of the QALY and the evLYG to determine treatment prices. Critics have argued the use of the evLYG along with the QALY does not do enough to fully eliminate the discriminatory aspects of the QALY measurement.

References

Health economics
Health care quality
Medical ethics